"State of Mind" is a song written and recorded by American country music artist Clint Black.  It was released in November 1993 as the third single from his album No Time to Kill.  It peaked at number 2 in both the United States and Canada.

The song's b-side, "Tuckered Out," charted at number 74 for the week of February 5, 1994.

Critical reception
A review in Billboard stated, "Set to a midtempo beat and energizing fiddles, Black reflects on the transporting power of familiar music."

Music video
The music video was directed by Palomar Pictures, and premiered in late 1993. It uses the single version of the song, which omits Black's harmonica solo in the beginning of the album version.

Chart positions

Year-end charts

References

1993 singles
1993 songs
Clint Black songs
Songs written by Clint Black
Song recordings produced by Clint Black
Song recordings produced by James Stroud
RCA Records singles